, known better by her stage name , is a Japanese voice actress, actress, and singer. She was born in Kure, Hiroshima, Japan.

Filmography

Anime
 Bokura ga Ita (2006), Nana Yamamoto 
 Kekkaishi (2006), girl (Episode 49), Kirara Kawagami, student (Episode 21) 
 Sugarbunnies (2007), Strawberry Usa 
 Yatterman (2008), Potaru Kuroimo (Episode 4) 
 Real Drive (2008), Risa Shimizu (Episode 8) 
 Hell Girl: Three Vessels (2008), Yume Kiuchi (Episode 18 : Special Radio) 
 Inuyasha: The Final Act (2009), Hide 
 Yumeiro Patissiere (2009), Mother (Episode 32) 
 Kimi ni Todoke (2009), Chigusa Takano, Hitomi 
 K-ON!! (2010), First year student (Episode 10) 
 Kimi ni Todoke 2nd Season (2011), Chigusa Takahashi (5 episodes), Hitomi (Episode 12) 
 Suite PreCure (2011), Female Student 3 (Episode 15), Female Student A (Episode 14), Girl (Episode 10), Rena (Episode 2), Small Sister (Episode 6), Sweets Club Member 
 Inazuma Eleven GO! (2011), Yamana Akane, Kousaka Yukie
 Tamagotchi! (2012), Knighttchi
 Space Dandy (2014), Honey
 Dragon Ball Super (2017), Yurin (Episode 89)

Drama CD
 The Idolmaster Innocent Blue for Dearly Stars (2011), Ayane Suzuki

External links 
 
 

1981 births
Living people
Japanese voice actresses
Musicians from Hiroshima Prefecture
21st-century Japanese singers
21st-century Japanese women singers